William John Davis CH (6 August 1848–20 October 1934) was a British trade unionist.

Born in Birmingham, Davis began working in a brass foundry.  In 1869, he represented his local reform organisation at the Trades Union Congress.  In 1871, he was a founder member of the Amalgamated Brassworkers Society, becoming its first general secretary.

Davis proved an effective secretary, increasing membership to 6,000 within a year.  He was also active in the local Liberal Party, and in 1876 was elected to the school board, then in 1880, he became the first Liberal-Labour member of Birmingham City Council.  In 1883, he stood down from the union to become a factory inspector.  Under different leadership, membership of the union fell to only 2,000, and Davis agreed to return in 1889.

Davis worked with Alexander Wilkie and Robert Knight to found the General Federation of Trade Unions in 1899.  From 1906 to 1910, he published The British Trades Union Congress: History and Recollections.  In 1913, he served as President of the Trades Union Congress.  He strongly supported the prosecution of both the Second Boer War and World War I, after which he led a short-lived movement for the Labour Party to focus solely on trade union issues.

Davis finally retired as general secretary of the Brassworkers in 1921, after which he retired to Paris.

References

1848 births
1934 deaths
Councillors in Birmingham, West Midlands
British trade union leaders
Members of the Parliamentary Committee of the Trades Union Congress
People from Birmingham, West Midlands
Presidents of the Trades Union Congress
Factory inspectors
Chairs of the Labour Party (UK)